A governess cart is a small two-wheeled horse-drawn cart. Their distinguishing feature is a small tub body, with two opposed inward-facing seats. They could seat four, although there was little room for four large adults. The driver sat sideways on one of these seats. The centre rear of the body was lowered, or else had a small hinged door, and there was a step beneath. The wheels were of moderate size, always fitted with mudguards, and usually carried on elliptical springs. The axle was either straight or dropped, giving a low, stable, centre of gravity. 

The purpose of the cart was to be light enough to be drawn by a well-tempered pony or cob, who would be gentle enough, according to the mores of the time, to be handled by a lady. This gave rise to the cart's name, as they were frequently used by governesses to transport their child charges. The governess rode in the cart with the passengers, where they could easily be observed. The cart was also relatively safe, being difficult to either fall from, overturn, or to injure oneself with either the horse or wheels.

The governess cart was a relatively late development in horse-drawn vehicles, appearing around 1900 as a substitute for the dogcart. These were a similar light cart, but their high exposed seats had a poor safety record for passengers, particularly children, falling from them.

See also 
 Jaunting car
 Types of carriages

References 

Carts
Animal-powered vehicles